Derrick John Rostagno (born October 25, 1965) is a former professional tennis player from the United States.

Career
Rostagno turned professional in 1986. He won one top-level singles title (at New Haven in 1990) and one tour doubles title (at Tampa in 1993).

Rostagno's best performance at a Grand Slam event came at the 1988 US Open, where he reached the quarterfinals by beating Yahiya Doumbia, Martin Davis, Tim Mayotte and Ronald Agénor before being defeated by Ivan Lendl.  At several other Grand Slam events, he defeated or almost defeated several tennis hall of famers.  At Wimbledon in 1988, Rostagno lost a five-set third round match to Jimmy Connors, who at the time was ranked World No. 5.  At the 1989 US Open, Rostagno had two straight match points in his second round encounter with Boris Becker, who won the second of those on a lucky net cord passing shot and eventually the match 1–6, 6–7, 6–3, 7–6, 6–3, en route to his lone US Open title. At Wimbledon in 1990, Rostagno defeated John McEnroe in straight sets in the first round.  At Wimbledon in 1991, Rostagno defeated ninth ranked Pete Sampras in four sets in the second round and Connors in straight sets in the third round.

Rostagno finished his career with a 3–2 win–loss record versus McEnroe, winning their last three matches, and a 2–3 record versus Connors, winning their last two matches.  Against other top players, Rostagno was 2–1 versus Sampras, 1–0 versus Yannick Noah, 1–1 versus Mats Wilander, 2–3 versus Lendl, 1–2 versus Becker, 3–6 versus Jim Courier, 0–1 versus Michael Chang, 0–1 versus Todd Martin, 0–2 versus Andre Agassi, and 0–4 versus Stefan Edberg.

Rostagno's career-high singles ranking was World No. 13, which he reached in 1991. His career prize-money earnings totaled US$1,621,535. He retired from the professional tour in 1996.

After retiring from the tour, Rostagno completed his undergraduate studies at Stanford University, obtained his MBA from UCLA and his law degree from Loyola University. He is now a practicing lawyer in Los Angeles, California, actively engaged in civil litigation in the firm that bears his name.

ATP career finals

Singles: 3 (1 title, 2 runner-ups)

Doubles: 1 (1 title)

ATP Challenger and ITF Futures finals

Singles: 1 (0–1)

Performance timelines

Singles

References

External links 
 
 

1965 births
American lawyers
American male tennis players
American people of Italian descent
Hopman Cup competitors
Living people
Loyola Law School alumni
Olympic tennis players of the United States
People from Hollywood, Los Angeles
Stanford Cardinal men's tennis players
Tennis people from California
Tennis players at the 1984 Summer Olympics
University of California, Los Angeles alumni